The Dothan–Enterprise–Ozark Combined Statistical Area was a CSA made up of five counties in the southeastern corner of the U.S. state of Alabama. The once statistical area includes one metropolitan area (Dothan MSA) and originally one micropolitan area (Enterprise–Ozark micropolitan area) which then was split off as two (Ozark μSA and Enterprise μSA). As of the 2010 census, the CSA had a population of 245,838. Currently an updated area called the Dothan-Ozark Combined Statistical area is used instead and Enterprise micropolitan area is now split as its own statistical area.

Components
 Metropolitan Statistical Areas (MSAs)
 Dothan (Geneva, Henry, and Houston counties) (still combined with Ozark μsa)
 Micropolitan Statistical Areas (μSAs)
 Enterprise–Ozark micropolitan area (original μsa)
 Enterprise (Coffee County) (current μsa, not combined anymore in a CSA)
 Ozark (Dale County) (current μsa, still combined with Dothan MSA)

See also
 Alabama census statistical areas

References

Dothan metropolitan area, Alabama
Enterprise–Ozark micropolitan area
Geography of Coffee County, Alabama
Geography of Dale County, Alabama
Geography of Geneva County, Alabama
Geography of Henry County, Alabama
Geography of Houston County, Alabama
Combined statistical areas of the United States